Bjørgeseter Station is an abandoned railway station on the Gjøvik Line at Bjørgeseter in Lunner, Norway. The station was opened in 1902 as Bjørgesæter, and received its current name in 1921. The station was closed following NSB Gjøvikbanen taking over operations of the line on 11 June 2006.

External links 
 Entry at the Norwegian Railway Club 

Railway stations in Lunner
Railway stations on the Gjøvik Line
Railway stations opened in 1902
1902 establishments in Norway
Railway stations closed in 2006
2006 disestablishments in Norway
Disused railway stations in Norway